Casciaro is a surname. Notable people with the surname include:

 Giuseppe Casciaro (1861–1941), Italian painter
 Kyle Casciaro (born 1987), Gibraltarian footballer
 Lee Casciaro (born 1981), Gibraltarian footballer
 Ryan Casciaro (born 1984), Gibraltarian footballer

Surnames of Italian origin